Frederick Palmer Warry (4 December 1880 – 4 February 1959) was an Australian rules footballer who played with St Kilda in the Victorian Football League (VFL).

References

External links 

1880 births
1959 deaths
VFL/AFL players born outside Australia
Australian rules footballers from Victoria (Australia)
St Kilda Football Club players
People educated at Melbourne Grammar School
Seychellois emigrants to Australia
Seychellois sportsmen